These are the results of the Rock Eisteddfod Challenge in Australia, since 1984.

National results 

: Molly Meldrum was a 1985 judge and reportedly said "Sarah Redfern High was easily best of the night and should have taken out first place".

National TV Specials

State and territory results

Australian Capital Territory

New South Wales

Newcastle Finals

Finals held in regional New South Wales

Bathurst

Newcastle

Wollongong

Queensland

Finals held in Brisbane

Finals held in regional Queensland

Cairns

Gold Coast

Rockhampton

Toowoomba

Townsville

South Australia

Tasmania

Victoria

Western Australia

Graphs

References

Performing arts education in Australia
Music competitions in Australia
Eisteddfod